Salaq-e Aman Kharlar (also Romanized as Salāq-e Āmān Kharlar; also known as Salāqāmānlar) is a village in Bagheli-ye Marama Rural District, in the Central District of Gonbad-e Qabus County, Golestan Province, Iran. At the 2006 census, its population was 745, in 166 families.

References 

Populated places in Gonbad-e Kavus County